Aroghjaranin kits, is a village in the Akhtala Municipality of the Lori Province of Armenia.

References 

Populated places in Lori Province